Sutoc (possibly from Quechua sut'u drop; point, -q a suffix, "drippy" or "point-shaped") is a  mountain in the Urubamba mountain range in the Andes of Peru. It is located in the Cusco Region, Urubamba Province, Urubamba District. It lies southwest of Pucajasa and the pass named Pumahuancajasa (Quechua for "Pumahuanca pass") and southeast of Pumahuanca.

References

Mountains of Peru
Mountains of Cusco Region